Baldone Parish is an administrative unit of Ķekava Municipality, Latvia. From 2009 until 2021, it was part of the former Baldone Municipality. It was created in 2010 from the countryside territory of Baldone town. At the beginning of 2015, the population of the parish was 3322. Baldone Parish is defined by Latvian law as belonging partly to the province of Vidzeme and partly to Semigallia.

Towns, villages and settlements of Baldone parish

References

Parishes of Latvia
Ķekava Municipality
Vidzeme
Semigallia